Am I Being Unreasonable? is a 6-part comedy-thriller series produced by Boffola Pictures and Lookout Point and written by, and starring, Daisy May Cooper and Selin Hizli. The series was broadcast on BBC One in the United Kingdom from 26 September 2022. The series will debut in the United States on Hulu on 11 April 2023. A second series was commissioned by the BBC in October 2022.

Synopsis
Cooper plays Nic, a mum stuck in a depressing marriage grieving a loss she can’t share with anyone. Hizli plays Jen who arrives in Nic’s life as a kindred spirit and school mum, but both are concealing secrets.

Cast
 Daisy May Cooper as Nic
 Selin Hizli as Jen 
 Lenny Rush as Ollie
 Jessica Hynes as Becca
 Dustin Demri-Burns as Dan
 Amanda Wilkin as Suzie
 David Fynn as Alex
 Juliet Cowan as Viv
 Samuel Bottomley as Boy
 Yohanna Ephrem as Girl
 Ruben Catt as Harry
 Karla Crome as Lucy
 Marek Larwood
Noah Carr-Kingsnorth as Dennon

Episodes

Production
The show’s title is borrowed from the Mumsnet message board of which Cooper told The Times “If you post anything on AIBU about whether you should end your marriage, they all scream ‘Leave the bastard,’ even if all he’s done is sing over the Coronation Street theme tune.” Cooper and Hizli knew each other from drama school. The show was partly improvised. Principal photography finished in  February 2022. The producer is Pippa Brown and the director is Jonny Campbell. The production companies are Boffola Pictures and Lookout Point. Executive producers are Jack Thorne, Shane Allen, Jonny Campbell, Daisy May Cooper, Kate Daughton, Selin Hizl.

Filming took place in 2021 at The Bottle Yard Studios in Bristol and on location in Gloucestershire.

A second series was commissioned by the BBC in October 2022.

Broadcast
The show was first broadcast on BBC One on 23 September 2022, with all episodes being made available in the UK on the BBC iPlayer on the same day. BBC Studios have international distribution rights. The series was originally meant to begin a week earlier, but was delayed, as were many other scheduled programmes, because of the death of Queen Elizabeth II and the resulting period of mourning.

The series will debut in the United States on Hulu, Internationally on Disney+ via Star and the latin america on Star+ on 11 April 2023.

Accolades
On 9 January 2023 the show received a nomination at the Comedy.co.uk Awards 2022 in the Best Comedy Drama Series category. On 23 January 2023 Cooper received a nomination for Outstanding Comedy Actress at the National Comedy Awards 2023, while Rush received a breakthrough award.

Rush was nominated for the Breakthrough Award, and Comedy Performance (Male) Award, for Am I Being Unreasonable? at the Royal Television Society Programme Awards in March 2023. The show itself was nominated for the Comedy Drama Award, and Cooper for Comedy Performance (Female), at the same ceremony.

References

External links 
 
 
 

English-language television shows
2022 British television series debuts
BBC television sitcoms
2020s British sitcoms
British thriller television series
Television series by BBC Studios